The Australian 2.0 Litre Touring Car Championship was a CAMS sanctioned Australian motor racing title contested in 1986, 1987 and 1993.
The title was renamed to Australian Manufacturers' Championship for 1994 and then to Australian Super Touring Championship in 1995.

Championship winners

References